Noel William Mulcahy (1929 – 28 February 2019) was an Irish Fianna Fáil politician. He was a member of Seanad Éireann from 1977 to 1981. He was an unsuccessful Fianna Fáil candidate for the Dublin North-Central constituency at the 1977 general election. He was nominated by the Taoiseach to the 14th Seanad in 1977. He did not contest the 1981 Seanad election.

Mulcahy died on 28 February 2019.

References

1929 births
2019 deaths
Fianna Fáil senators
Members of the 14th Seanad
Nominated members of Seanad Éireann